The Redwood Valley Railway is a  gauge miniature railway in Tilden Regional Park near Berkeley, California.

History

Thomsen worked in the engineering department for the Western Pacific Railroad and received at least three patents for his work. The railway occupies land near the base of Vollmer Peak that was previously used as an anti-aircraft gun emplacement.

800 now-mature redwood trees were planted when the railroad was initially laid out. The new 15" gauge, 5" scale equipment allowed two adults to ride side by side and is representative of American narrow gauge railroads. Two of Redwood Valley's locomotives have made trips to England, run on several English 15 in gauge railways, including the Ravenglass and Eskdale. After Thomsen died in 1995, his daughter Ellen assumed operations of the Redwood Valley Railway.

Operations
Rides last approximately 12 minutes. As of January 2023, tickets for adults and children are $4.00 (children under 2 years old ride free). A five-ride ticket costs $16.

Schedule
The Redwood Valley Railway operates Saturday and Sunday from 11 am to 6 pm year-round (11am to sundown in winter - weather permitting).

During the summer (from mid June to Labor Day) the railway operates 7 days a week from 11 am to 5 pm weekdays and 11 am to 6 pm weekends.

Special events
The first full weekend in June is the Anniversary Meet, which is open to the public from 11am to 6pm. Most of the RVRy's locomotives are under steam, and often visiting locomotives and rolling stock appear for the occasion.

RVRy celebrates "Winterfest", usually during the first and second  weekends of December. During this time, the railway opens at its normal hours but closes after dark at 7pm. Guests experience the magic of the winter forest after dark complete with Father Solstice on his own train, illuminated themed areas of the railroad pertaining to the stages of water and a warm, holiday atmosphere. Ticket prices are the same as normal operating days.

Rolling stock

Locomotives
The railroad has four 15-inch scale steam locomotives, designed by Erich Thomsen and built on location by the railroad's Redwood Valley Shops. Each is designed for service on the RVRy and while they are not based on any full-size prototypes, they share many details with engines built by the Baldwin Locomotive Works built between 1875 and 1910 In addition, RVRy owns a single diesel-hydraulic locomotive, number 2, which only is used for maintenance-of-way.

Cars and other stock
The Redwood Valley Railway maintains a dozen or so wooden gondolas, built similar to those found on 36" narrow-gauge lines in the American West. The gondolas, equipped with seating for up to eight adults, are the mainstay passenger rolling stock for this operation. The RVRy also owns three stock cars which have been specifically built to carry passengers as well. These are often favorites with small children, although a full-sized adult can comfortably fit inside.

Other equipment includes a boxcar, extra convertible gondolas, which can either haul passengers or satisfy maintenance-of-way needs.

The RVRy owns numerous four-wheel maintenance-of-way cars known as "jimmies", which have specialized uses such as welding, tie replacement, or carrying ballast.

The RVRy also rosters a single flatcar, built as a high school shop project by one of the crew in the 1970s. This rugged flatcar has seen thousands of uses, and is one of the most versatile cars on the railroad.

Unique among the roster of cars is a coal gondola, once used to carry extra coal for number 4. Coal was used up until the mid-1970s when number 4 was converted to fuel oil. The coal gondola, with its higher sides, is infrequently used. It currently carries a few dozen metal folding chairs for the annual meet.

A favorite with both young and old is the caboose. Based on a D&RGW 36" gauge prototype, this "short" center cupola caboose has graced the end of most revenue trains for over 30 years.

Future projects
Parts for a 2-4-4 Forney and a 2-6-0 exist, but currently remain unassembled. Plans for a second caboose and a lavish, scale (down to the furniture, wallpaper, and bar with tiny glasses) business car are in the works.

As of mid-2010 the boiler for number 13, the aforementioned 2-6-0 has been manufactured. Not to be confused with a visiting GSP&P 13 from the Glenwood Southpark and Pacific.

Former
Number 1 Cricket, the -gauge 4-4-0 steam locomotive that was first used when service started in 1952, along with a few 12" gauge cars were sold to the Folsom Valley Ry. in Folsom, California

References

External links

**As of May 27, 2018, their official website is being rerouted to some spam web site**

 The railway's official website
 
 
 

Heritage railroads in California
Railroad museums in California
Transportation in Contra Costa County, California
Tourist attractions in Contra Costa County, California
15 in gauge railways in the United States
Tilden Regional Park
Miniature railroads in the United States